Chery is a Chinese automobile manufacturer.

Chery or Chéry may also refer to:

 Chery (surname)
 Chéry, a commune in the Cher département of the Centre region of France
 Mont Chéry, a mountain in the Chablais Alps in Haute-Savoie, France

See also 
 Chéry-Chartreuve, a commune in the Aisne department in Picardy in northern France
 Chéry-lès-Pouilly, a commune in the Aisne department in Picardy in northern France
 Chéry-lès-Rozoy, a commune in the Aisne department in Picardy in northern France
 Cherie
 Cherry (disambiguation)
 Cheryl (disambiguation)